A list of horror films released in 1996.

References

Lists of horror films by year
1996-related lists